Born to Be King may refer to:

 Born to Be King (2000 film), a Hong Kong crime drama film, part 6 of the Young and Dangerous film series 
 Born to Be King (2014 film), a film written and directed by Peter Capaldi
 Born to Be King (2015 film), directed by Puneet Issar
 Born to Be King (Blackadder), 1983 season 1 episode 2 of Blackadder
 Born to Be Kings (1986 song) alternate titling of the Queen song Princes of the Universe

See also
 The Man Born to Be King (1942 radio drama) a BBC audio play about Jesus Christ
 Jesus